Sekolah Menengah Kebangsaan Datuk Peter Mojuntin (English: Datuk Peter Mojuntin National Secondary School; commonly known as SMK Datuk Peter Mojuntin or SMKDPM) is one of the secondary schools in Sabah which is located at Penampang, Kota Kinabalu, Malaysia. It is close to Sabah's Capital, Kota Kinabalu.

Named after Datuk Peter Joinud Mojuntin, State Minister of Municipal Administration, who was killed in 1976 among with other Sabahan politicians, SMK Datuk Peter Mojuntin, State Sports School and ‘Lestari’ School is a suburban school located 15 km from Kota Kinabalu City. The school is named after the late Datuk Peter Mojuntin, a politician from Sabah.  The school was officially opened on 27 February 1979 by the then Education Minister Dato’ (now Tun) Musa Hitam.

History

The school has 99 teachers, 15 non-teaching staff and 1365 students under the leadership of the principal, Pn. Nuraini Fauziah Derin and the majority of the students are from Kadazandusun ethnic who come from the remote areas of Penampang district like Buayan, Terian, and Longkogungan as well as nearby villages within the school area such as Hungab, Babah/Bunduon, Hubah, Sukod (Suok/Kodundungan/Digot), Terawi, Guunsing and many more within the Penampang region (from all villages on both halves of Penampang, Donggongon and Putatan, which are the nearest towns to this school).

SMKDPM has 3 central units - E-Management, Recreational School and Resource Centre Across School.

The E-Management is implemented to achieve a systematic management. The Information System used is the Students Information System, Discipline, Co-curricular, Fees, Attendance, NILAM, Audio Visual Aids, Information System for Malaysian Certificate  of Education, Malaysian Higher certificate of education and Lower Secondary assessment (SPM, STPM and PMR), Automation for the Resource Centre, Salary, Timetable and School Assessment System

Activities conducted by the Resource Centre of the school are:
 Focus Exhibition by every class.
 Mini library in each class.
 Corridors of information and knowledge.

The school building was repainted in stages which started in the year 2002 with the help and co-operation of the YB, community and the education department. A few buildings were erected namely the Open Hall, Squash Court, Hostel Dining Hall, Computer laboratory, the Grooming Room and the Rekacipta (Invention) Studio.

Schools in Sabah
Secondary schools in Malaysia